The Forest House, near Yreka, California, was built in 1852.  It was listed on the National Register of Historic Places in 2011. The listing included six contributing buildings and three non-contributing ones.

It is a building complex that was the center of the Forest House Ranch, "centered upon the Forest House itself, a two-story, wood-frame, building built circa 1852 on the Yreka-Fort Jones Road."  It includes 19th century barns and outbuildings.  

It was built upon what was originally a private toll road and served as a hotel and a meeting hall.

References

Hotels in California
National Register of Historic Places in Siskiyou County, California
Greek Revival architecture in California
Buildings and structures completed in 1852